Aidil Sharin Sahak (born 9 July 1977) is a former Singaporean football player and professional football head coach for Liga 1 club Persikabo 1973.

Coaching career

Home United
He led Home United to 2nd place in the 1st season of the Singapore Premier League in 2018. He also led the club to the AFC Cup ASEAN Zonal Final Runner-up medal in 2017 and the Winners medal in 2018.

Kedah
On 8 October 2018, Aidil had been appointed as Kedah Darul Aman head coach for the Malaysia Super League 2019 season. On his debut on 2 February 2019, the side won 2-0 against PKNP through a Shakir Hamzah and Jonathan Bauman goal. On 8 March 2019, Aidil Sharin experienced his first defeat in charge of Kedah as the club fell to a 1–0 defeat at the hands of Pahang. Kedah finished in fourth position in the Malaysia Super League in his first season in charge, one position higher than the previous season. On 27 July 2019, he led Kedah to win Malaysia FA Cup title, after a 1–0 win over Perak in the final. The following 26 October, the team reached the final of the Malaysia Cup following a 8–8 aggregate win over Sri Pahang,  only to be beaten 3–0 by Johor Darul Ta'zim in the decisive game at Bukit Jalil National Stadium.

Aidil became the first Singaporean head coach to manage a non-Singaporean team in the Asian Champions League when he guided Kedah into the 2020 Asian Champions League playoffs.

On 17 October 2022, it was announced that Kedah Darul Aman had parted ways with Aidil Sharin. Aidil Sharin Sahak departed Kedah Darul Aman with a record of 55 wins, 20 draws, and 35 defeats in 110 games with a win percentage of 50%. During the four years that he was the head coach, Aidil Sharin guided Kedah to several highs, including emerging as 2019 FA Cup champions, 2019 Malaysia Cup runners-up, 2020 and 2021 Super League runners-up as well as reaching the 2022 Asian Football Confederation (AFC) Cup ASEAN Zone semi-finals.

Personal life
Aidil is the younger brother of former Singapore national footballer, Aide Iskandar.

Managerial statistics

Honours

Head coach 
Kedah 
 Malaysia FA Cup:  2019

References

1977 births
Living people
Singaporean footballers
Association football midfielders
Singaporean expatriate sportspeople in Malaysia
Singaporean people of Malay descent
Singapore Premier League head coaches
Singaporean football managers
Home United FC players